Sinnion  (undetermined origin, perhaps Iranian) was a Kutrigur leader of the 6th century.

Sinnion was a veteran of the Vandalic War. Noted for their strength and bravery, Sinnion and Balas led a group of 600 auxiliaries (all mounted archers), at the Battle of Ad Decimum (September 13, 533).

After the Utigurs led by Sandilch had attacked the Kutrigurs, Sinnion succeeded Chinialon as leader of the Kutrigurs between 551 and 558. Having suffered great losses, the Kutrigurs made a peace treaty with Byzantine Empire, and 2000 Kutrigurs with their wives and children were led by Sinnion into the Empire's service and were settled in Thrace. The shelter provided to the Kutrigurs was not well received by Sandilch. 

Sinnion was succeeded by Zabergan.

References

Sources

6th-century monarchs in Europe
Kutrigurs
6th-century Byzantine military personnel
Vandalic War
Medieval Thrace